Chitin is a chemical compound found in fungi and animals.

Chitin may also refer to:
 Chitin, Iran, a village
 Chitin: I, a board game

See also 
 Chetin (disambiguation)
 Chiton (disambiguation)
 Chitting, an agricultural technique
 Chitlins, a culinary dish